Eydelstedt is a municipality in the district of Diepholz, in Lower Saxony, Germany.

People 
 Christian Hülsmeyer (1881-1957),  German inventor, physicist and entrepreneur

References

Diepholz (district)